Freethinkers Hall, also known as Park Hall, is a meeting hall in Sauk City, Wisconsin. Designed by Alfred Clas, Freethinkers Hall was built in 1884 for the local Freethinkers congregation, or Freie Gemeinde in German. The congregation had been formed by German immigrants in 1852, and became the last extant Freethinker congregation in North America. It affiliated with the American Unitarian Association in 1955. The group meets in the hall to this day.

See also
List of Unitarian, Universalist, and Unitarian Universalist churches

References

Further reading 
 Goc, Michael J. (ed.) Park Hall: a Symbol of Freedom in America. Friendship, WI: New Past Press, 2004.

External links 

 Official website
 Park Hall a sometimes overlooked gem
 Sauk City, Wisconsin, Freie Gemeinde

Freethought in the United States
German-American culture in Wisconsin
Churches on the National Register of Historic Places in Wisconsin
Queen Anne architecture in Wisconsin
Religious buildings and structures completed in 1884
Buildings and structures in Sauk County, Wisconsin
National Register of Historic Places in Sauk County, Wisconsin